John Heaver Fremlin (4 March 1913 – 9 March 1995) was an English nuclear physicist.

Life and work

Fremlin was secretary of the Cambridge Scientists Anti-War Group. Responding to concerns about the use of poison gas bombs, he hosted experiments by the group in his room in Trinity College to determine the rate at which a gas might leak into a sealed room. However Jack Haldane queried the rigour of his scientific methodology.

His papers are archived at the University of Birmingham.  Celia Fremlin was his sister.

References

External links
 List of publications
 There isn't a Snake in the Cupboard, biography by Margaret Kettlewell.

1913 births
1995 deaths
English nuclear physicists